Ludovico Donato (died 1385 or 1386) was an Italian Franciscan. He became Minister General of his order, of the Rome obedience during the Western Schism, in 1379. In 1383 he was created a Cardinal, the first ever from Venice.

He was arrested with four other cardinals in 1385 (Gentile di Sangro, Adam Easton, Bartolomeo de Coturno, and Marino Giudice), suspected of conspiring against Pope Urban VI. They were imprisoned and tortured. Donato is believed to have been executed around January 1386.

Notes

External links
Biography
Franaut page

1386 deaths
14th-century Venetian people
14th-century Italian Roman Catholic bishops
Italian Friars Minor
Bishops of Belluno
14th-century Italian cardinals
Year of birth unknown
Ministers General of the Order of Friars Minor